The 1806 United Kingdom general election was the election of members to the 3rd Parliament of the United Kingdom. This was the second general election to be held after the Union of Great Britain and Ireland.

The general election took place in a situation of considerable uncertainty about the future of British politics, following the sudden death of William Pitt the Younger and the formation of the Ministry of all the Talents.

The second United Kingdom Parliament was dissolved on 24 October 1806. The new Parliament was summoned to meet on 13 December 1806, for a maximum seven-year term from that date. The maximum term could be and normally was curtailed, by the monarch dissolving the Parliament, before its term expired.

Political situation

Since the previous general election fighting in the Napoleonic Wars with France had resumed in 1803. Tory Prime Minister Henry Addington had resigned in 1804. William Pitt the Younger formed a new coalition of pro-government Whig and Tory politicians to prosecute the war.

The opposition Whigs, led by Charles James Fox, continued to oppose the government. They were strengthened by a group of Pitt's former supporters (such as his cousin William Grenville, 1st Baron Grenville) who had aligned themselves with Fox in opposition to Addington after 1802 and who did not accompany Pitt and his other friends back to office in 1804.

When Pitt died on 23 January 1806 a new ministry was formed by Grenville. It included Fox and Addington (now ennobled as the 1st Viscount Sidmouth) as well as other leading political figures of the day. However it did not include George Canning, who had inherited the leadership of Pitt's faction in the House of Commons or the Duke of Portland who led it in the House of Lords. This government was known as the Ministry of all the Talents.

An attempt was made to end the Napoleonic Wars by negotiation. As this hope failed the war continued. Grenville also tried to strengthen the government, but was unable to persuade the Pittites to join him either as a body or by detaching some leading figures. The Prime Minister was not prepared to exclude Fox and his friends as the Pittites wanted.

Lord Grenville then decided to hold a general election to strengthen his government. The King granted a dissolution.

The Talents were in office at the time of this election and continued after it, but the Ministry was weakened by the death of Fox on 13 September 1806. The election itself was a disappointment. In the eighteenth century a government with the King's backing could expect to make substantial gains at an election. However Pitt's financial reforms had weakened the ability of the Treasury to manipulate election results. Foord estimated that the Ministry only gained about thirty seats by the 1806 appeal to the country.

Dates of election
At this period there was not one election day. After receiving a writ (a royal command) for the election to be held, the local returning officer fixed the election timetable for the particular constituency or constituencies he was concerned with. Polling in seats with contested elections could continue for many days.

The time between the first and last contested elections was 29 October to 17 December 1806.

Results

Seats summary

Summary of the constituencies

Monmouthshire (1 County constituency with 2 MPs and one single member Borough constituency) is included in Wales in these tables. Sources for this period may include the county in England.

Table 1: Constituencies and MPs, by type and country

Table 2: Number of seats per constituency, by type and country

See also
United Kingdom general elections
Members of the 3rd UK Parliament from Ireland

Notes

References
 British Electoral Facts 1832–1999, compiled and edited by Colin Rallings and Michael Thrasher (Ashgate Publishing Ltd 2000). Source: Dates of Elections – Footnote to Table 5.02
 British Historical Facts 1760–1830, by Chris Cook and John Stevenson (The Macmillan Press 1980). Source: Types of constituencies – Great Britain
 His Majesty's Opposition 1714–1830, by Archibald S. Foord (Oxford University Press 1964)
 Parliamentary Election Results in Ireland 1801–1922, edited by B.M. Walker (Royal Irish Academy 1978). Source: Types of constituencies – Ireland

1806 elections in the United Kingdom
General election
1806
1800s elections in Ireland